Autoba olivacea, the brinjal leaf roller, is a moth of the family Erebidae. The species was first described by Francis Walker in 1858. It is found in several African countries such as Botswana, Eritrea, Madagascar, Malawi, Mozambique, Nigeria, South Africa, Tanzania, Uganda and Zimbabwe. It is also found in Sri Lanka. and India.

Larval food plants are Solanum melongena, Solamun pectinatum and Gossypium species.

References

External links
Seasonal incidence and control of insect pests of brinjal with special reference to shoot and fruit borer, Leucinodes orbonalis Guen. in Meghalaya
Bioecology and Management of Leucinodes orbonalis Guenée on Brinjal

Moths of Asia
Moths described in 1858
Boletobiinae